is a railway station in the city of Itoigawa, Niigata, Japan, operated by Echigo Tokimeki Railway.

Lines

Station layout
The station consists of two island platforms on an embankment, level with the second story of a two-story station building.

Platforms

History
The station opened on 16 December 1912, as part of the Japanese Government Railways (JGR, JNR after 1949). It was relocated to its present location of 1 October 1961.

From this date, Nō Station was transferred to the ownership of the third-sector operating company Echigo Tokimeki Railway.

Passenger statistics
In fiscal 2017, the station was used by an average of 331 passengers daily (boarding passengers only).

See also
 List of railway stations in Japan

References

External links

Train timetables 

Railway stations in Niigata Prefecture
Railway stations in Japan opened in 1912
Stations of Echigo Tokimeki Railway
Itoigawa, Niigata